Andrei Rublev (Andrey Rublyóv) is a 1966 Soviet biographical historical drama film directed by Andrei Tarkovsky and co-written with Andrei Konchalovsky. The film was re-edited from the 1966 film titled The Passion According to Andrei by Tarkovsky which was censored during the first decade of the Brezhnev era in the Soviet Union. The film is loosely based on the life of Andrei Rublev, the 15th-century Russian icon painter. The film features Anatoly Solonitsyn, Nikolai Grinko, Ivan Lapikov, Nikolai Sergeyev, Nikolai Burlyayev and Tarkovsky's wife Irma Raush. Savva Yamshchikov, a famous Russian restorer and art historian, was a scientific consultant of the film.

Andrei Rublev is set against the background of early-15th-century Russia. Although the film is only loosely based on the life of Andrei Rublev, it seeks to depict a realistic portrait of medieval Russia. Tarkovsky sought to create a film that shows the artist as "a world-historic figure" and "Christianity as an axiom of Russia's historical identity" during a turbulent period of Russian history that ultimately resulted in the Tsardom of Russia. 

The film's themes include artistic freedom, religion, political ambiguity, autodidacticism, and the making of art under a repressive regime. Because of this, it was not released domestically in the officially atheist Soviet Union for years after it was completed, except for a single 1966 screening in Moscow. A version of the film was shown at the 1969 Cannes Film Festival, where it won the FIPRESCI prize. In 1971, a censored version of the film was released in the Soviet Union. The film was further cut for commercial reasons upon its U.S. release through Columbia Pictures in 1973. As a result, several versions of the film exist.

Although these issues with censorship obscured and truncated the film for many years following its release, the film was soon recognized by many western critics and film directors as a highly original and accomplished work. Even more since being restored to its original version, Andrei Rublev has come to be regarded as one of the greatest films of all time, and has often been ranked highly in both the Sight & Sound critics' and directors' polls.

Plot

Andrei Rublev is divided into eight episodes, with a prologue and an epilogue only loosely related to the main film. The main film charts the life of the great icon painter through seven episodes which either parallel his life or represent episodic transitions in his life. The background is 15th century Russia, a turbulent period characterized by fighting between rival princes and the Tatar invasions.

Prologue 

The film's prologue shows the preparations for a hot air balloon ride. The balloon is tethered to the spire of a church next to a river, with a man named Yefim (Nikolay Glazkov) attempting to make the flight by use of a harness roped beneath the balloon. 

At the very moment of his attempt, an ignorant mob arrive from the river and attempt to thwart the flight, putting a firebrand into the face of one of the men on the ground assisting Yefim. In spite of this the balloon is successfully released and Yefim is overwhelmed and delighted by the view from above and the sensation of flying, but he cannot prevent a crash-landing shortly after. 

He is the first of several creative characters, representing the daring escapist, whose hopes are easily crushed. After the crash, a horse is seen rolling on its back by a pond, one of many horses in the film.

I. The Jester (Summer 1400) 
Andrei (Anatoly Solonitsyn), Daniil (Nikolai Grinko) and Kirill (Ivan Lapikov) are wandering monks and religious icon painters, looking for work. The three represent different creative characters. 

Andrei is the observer, a humanist who searches for the good in people and wants to inspire and not frighten. Daniil is withdrawn and resigned, and not as bent on creativity as on self-realization. Kirill lacks talent as a painter, yet still strives to achieve prominence. He is jealous, self-righteous, very intelligent and perceptive. 

The three have just left the Andronikov Monastery, where they have lived for many years, heading to Moscow. During a heavy rain shower they seek shelter in a barn, where a group of villagers is being entertained by a jester (Rolan Bykov). The jester, or skomorokh, is a bitterly sarcastic enemy of the state and the Church, who earns a living with his scathing and obscene social commentary and by making fun of the Boyars. He ridicules the monks as they come in, and after some time Kirill leaves unnoticed. 

Shortly after, a group of soldiers arrive to arrest the skomorokh, whom they take outside, knock unconscious and take away, also smashing his musical instrument. As the rain has stopped, Kirill returns. Kirill wants to leave, so Andrei wakes up resting Daniil. Unaware of what has happened to the jester, Daniil thanks the villagers for the shelter. As they walk on, the heavy rain starts again.

II. Theophanes the Greek (Summer–Winter–Spring–Summer 1405–1406) 
Kirill arrives at the workshop of Theophanes the Greek (Nikolai Sergeyev), a prominent and well-recognized master painter, who is working on a new icon of Jesus Christ. Theophanes is portrayed as a complex character: an established artist, humanistic and God-fearing in his views yet somewhat cynical, regarding his art more as a craft and a chore in his disillusion with other people.

His young apprentices have all run away to the town square, where a wrongly convicted criminal is about to be tortured and executed. Kirill talks to Theophanes, and the artist, impressed by the monk's understanding and erudition, invites him to work as his apprentice on the decoration of the Cathedral of the Annunciation in Moscow. Kirill refuses at first, but then accepts the offer on the condition that Theophanes will personally come to the Andronikov Monastery and invite Kirill to work with him in front of all the fraternity and Andrei Rublev, who is renowned for his icon painting in the outside world, an admiration shared by Kirill and Theophanes. 

A short while later at the Andronikov Monastery, a messenger arrives from Moscow to ask for assistance in decorating the cathedral, as arranged, but instead of Kirill, he propositions Andrei. Both Daniil and Kirill are agitated by the recognition that Andrei receives. Daniil refuses to accompany Andrei and reproaches him for accepting Theophanes’ offer without considering his fellows, but soon repents of his temper and tearfully wishes Andrei well when the younger monk comes to say goodbye to his friend. Kirill is jealous of Andrei and, in a fit of anger, decides to leave the monastery for the secular world, throwing accusations of greed in the face of his fellow monks, who also dismiss him. Kirill stumbles out of the monastery into the snowy countryside and is followed by his dog, but, in anger, he savagely beats it with his walking stick and leaves it for dead.

III. The Passion (1406) 

Andrei leaves for Moscow with his young apprentice Foma (Mikhail Kononov). While walking in the woods, Andrei and Foma have a conversation about Foma's flaws, and in particular lying. Foma confesses to having taken honey from an apiary, after Andrei notices his cassock is sticky, and he smears mud on his face to soothe a bee sting. 

While Foma has talent as an artist, he is less interested in the deeper meaning of his work and more concerned with the practical aspects of the job, like perfecting his azure, a color which at the time was often considered unstable to mix. They encounter Theophanes in the forest, and the old master sends Foma away, unimpressed by his attitude to art. As he leaves, the apprentice finds a dead swan; after poking it with a stick, he admires its wing and fantasizes about having a bird's-eye view.

In the forest, Andrei and Theophanes argue about religion, while Foma cleans his master's paint brushes. Theophanes argues that the ignorance of the Russian people is due to stupidity, while Andrei says that he doesn't understand how he can be a painter and maintain such views. This section contains a Passion Play, or a reenactment of Christ's Crucifixion, on a snow-covered hillside which plays out as Andrei recounts the events of Christ's death and expresses his belief that the men who crucified him were obeying God's will and loved him.

IV. The Holiday (1408) 
Camping for the night on a riverbank, Andrei and Foma are collecting firewood for their traveling party when Andrei hears the distant sounds of celebration further upstream in the woods. Going to investigate, he comes upon a large group of naked pagans who are conducting a lit-torch ritual for Kupala Night. Andrei is intrigued and excited by the behaviour of the pagans but is caught spying on a couple making love, tied to the crossbeam of a hut, his arms raised in a mockery of Jesus' crucifixion, and is threatened with drowning in the morning. 

A woman named Marfa (Nelly Snegina), dressed only in a fur coat, approaches Andrei. After explaining to Andrei, who lashes her with prejudice, that her people are persecuted for their beliefs, she drops her coat, kisses Andrei and then unties him. Andrei runs away and is lost in the dense woods, scratching his face. The next morning Andrei returns to his group, with Daniil now present, and as they leave on their boats a group of soldiers appear on the riverbank chasing after several of the pagans, including Marfa. In the struggle, her lover is captured, but she manages to escape by swimming naked into the river, passing right by Andrei's boat. He and his fellow monks look away in shame.

V. The Last Judgment (Summer 1408) 
Andrei and Daniil are working on the decoration of a church in Vladimir. Although they have been there for two months the walls are still white and bare. A messenger, Patrikei (Yuri Nikulin), arrives with word from the Bishop, who is furious, to say they have until autumn to finish the job. On a nearby road in the middle of a field of flowers Andrei confides to Daniil that the task disgusts him and that he is unable to paint a subject such as the Last Judgement as he doesn't want to terrify people into submission. He comes to the conclusion that he has lost the ease of mind that an artist needs for his work. Foma, impatient and wanting to work, resigns and leaves Andrei's group to take up the offer of painting a smaller, less prestigious church.
 
Stone carvers and decorators of Andrei's party have also been working on the Grand Duke's mansion. The Prince is dissatisfied with the work done, and wants it to be redone, more in line with his tastes, but the workers already have another job, which is to help set up the mansion of the Grand Duke's brother, and they promptly refuse and leave, after indignantly proclaiming that the Grand Duke's brother will have a much more splendid home than he himself. While walking on a path through a nearby forest towards the mansion of their client, the artisans are assaulted by soldiers sent by the Grand Duke, and their eyes are gouged out, leaving them incapable of practicing their craft.

Back at the church, Andrei is dismayed by the news of the attack on the artisans and angrily throws paint and smears it on one of the walls. Sergei (Vladimir Titov), a young apprentice who escaped the assault unharmed, reads a random section of the bible aloud, at Daniil's request, concerning women. A young woman, Durochka (Irma Raush), whose name identifies her as a holy fool, or Yurodivy, wanders in to take shelter from the rain and is upset by the sight of the paint on the wall. Her feeble-mindedness and innocence inspires in Andrei the idea to paint a feast.

VI. The Raid (Autumn 1408) 
While the Grand Duke is away in Lithuania, his power-hungry younger brother forms an allegiance with a group of Tatars and raids Vladimir. In a flashback, the Grand Duke and his brother attend a religious service in a church, and the rivalry and animosity between them is clear. The invasion of the combined armed forces, their men on horseback, results in great carnage: the city is burned, the citizens murdered and women raped and killed. One scene shows a horse falling from a flight of stairs. 

Foma, who is in the midst of the chaos, narrowly escapes being killed in the city by a Russian soldier and escapes into the nearby countryside, but as he is crossing a river he is shot in the back with an arrow and killed. The Tatars force their way into the barricaded church, now fully decorated with Andrei's paintings, where the majority of the citizens have taken refuge. The Tatars show no mercy and massacre the people inside and burn all the painted wooden altarpieces. Andrei, who is also in the church, saves Durochka from being raped by a Russian soldier by killing him with an axe. The bishop's messenger Patrikei is also present; he is tortured with fire to make him reveal the location of the city's gold, which he refuses to do. After being repeatedly burned with a flaming torch, he has hot liquid metal from a melted crucifix poured into his mouth silencing his screams. Then he is dragged away feet first, tied to a horse.

In the aftermath only Andrei and Durochka are left alive in the church. Andrei imagines a conversation with the dead Theophanes the Greek, lamenting the loss of his work and the cruelty of mankind, while Durochka distractedly plaits the hair of a dead woman. Andrei decides to give up painting and takes a vow of silence to atone for his killing of another man.

VII. Silence (Winter 1412) 
Note: In the 205-minute version known as The Passion According to Andrei, this episode is titled The Charity
Andrei is once again at the Andronikov Monastery as famine and war grip the country. He no longer paints and never speaks, and keeps Durochka with him as a fellow companion in silence.

In the same monastery, refugees discuss the problems plaguing their respective home towns, and one man who appears starts telling, in a broken voice, of his escape from Vladimir. He is recognized by a younger monk as the long absent Kirill. He has suffered during his time away from the monastery and begs the father superior to allow him to return. His wish is granted after much pleading and initial rejection, but he is instructed to copy out the holy scriptures 15 times in penance. 

Soon, a group of Tatars stops at the monastery while traveling through the region, much to the concern of Andrei and Kirill who have experienced their brutality first hand. Durochka, however, is too simple-minded to understand or remember what the Tatars did and is fascinated by the shining breastplate carried by one of them. The group taunt and play with her, but the Tatar takes a liking to her, putting his horned helmet on her head and dressing her in a blanket, promising to take her away with him as his eighth, and only Russian, wife. 

Andrei attempts to stop her from leaving, but she is delighted with the Tatar's gifts, and she rides away with the Tatars. Kirill approaches Andrei and talks to him for the first time since their departure from the monastery, and he assures him that Durochka won't be in any danger, as harming a holy fool is considered bad luck and a great sin, and that she will be let go. Andrei still does not speak, despite Kirill's despaired pleading, and continues his menial work of carrying large hot stones from a fire with tongs to heat water for the monastery, but drops the stone in the snow.

VIII. The Bell (Spring–Summer–Winter–Spring 1423–1424) 
This episode concerns Boriska, (Nikolai Burlyayev) the young son of an expert bellmaker. Men have been sent by the prince to search out Boriska's father in order to ask him to cast a bronze bell for a church. Instead, they come upon Boriska, who tells them that the area has been ravaged by a plague, and that his father, as well as all his family, is dead. He furthermore tells them that he is the only one who possesses the secret, delivered by his father at his death bed, of casting a quality bronze bell, and asks them to take him with them, as he is, by his own contention, the only person left alive who can complete the task successfully. The men are initially dismissive, but soon agree, and Boriska is put in charge of the project.

At the site, Boriska contradicts and challenges the instincts of the workers in choosing the location of the pit, the selection of the proper clay, the building of the mold, the firing of the furnaces and finally the hoisting of the bell. The workers soon complain to him that his father treated them differently and one worker, who refuses his orders, is flogged in punishment. The process of making the bell grows into a huge, expensive endeavour with many hundreds of workers and Boriska makes several risky decisions, guided only by his instincts; soon, even he doubts the project's prospective success. Andrei, who has arrived on the scene, silently watches Boriska during the casting, and the younger man notices him too.

During the bell-making, the skomorokh (jester) from the first sequence makes a reappearance amongst the crowds who have come to watch the bell being raised up and, seeing Andrei, he threatens to kill him, mistaking him for Kirill, his denouncer of years past. Kirill's implication of the man led to him being imprisoned and tortured. Kirill soon arrives and intervenes on behalf of the silent Andrei and later privately confesses to Andrei that his sinful envy of his talent dissipated once he heard Andrei had abandoned painting and that it was he who had denounced the skomorokh. Kirill then criticizes Andrei for allowing his God-given talent for painting to go to waste and pleads with him to resume his artistry, but receives no response.

As the bell-making nears completion, Boriska's confidence slowly transforms into a stunned, detached disbelief that he's seemingly succeeded at the task. As the furnaces are opened and the molten metal pours into the mould, he privately asks God for help. The work crew takes over as Boriska makes several attempts to fade into the background of the activities. After completion, the bell is hoisted into its tower and the Grand Duke and his entourage arrive for the inaugural ceremony as the bell is blessed by a priest. As the bell is prepared to be rung, some Italian ambassadors in the royal entourage express their doubt over the prospective success of its ringing. It is revealed that Boriska and the work crew know that if the bell fails to ring, the Grand Duke will have them all beheaded. (It is also overheard that the Grand Duke has already had his brother, the one who raided Vladimir, beheaded.) 

There is a quiet, agonizing tension among the crowd as the foreman slowly coaxes the bell's clapper back and forth, nudging it closer to the lip of the bell with each swing. A pan across the assembly reveals the white-robed Durochka, leading a horse and preceded by a child which is, presumably, hers, as she walks through the crowd. At the critical moment the bell rings perfectly, and she smiles. After the ceremony, Andrei finds Boriska collapsed on the ground, sobbing. He admits his father never actually told him his bell-casting secret. Andrei, impressed by the effect the successful ringing has had on the rejoicing crowd, realizes the joy that his own art might bring. He comforts Boriska, breaking his vow of silence and telling the boy that they should carry on their work together: “You’ll cast bells. I’ll paint icons.” Andrei then sees Durochka, the boy and the horse walk off across a muddy field in the distance. The eighth part of the film ends with this scene and it is followed by an epilogue.

Epilogue
The epilogue is the only part of the film in color and shows time-aged, but still vibrant, details of several of Andrei Rublev's actual icons. The icons are shown in the following order: Enthroned Christ, Twelve Apostles, The Annunciation, Twelve Apostles, Jesus entering Jerusalem, Birth of Christ, Enthroned Christ, Transfiguration of Jesus, Resurrection of Lazarus, The Annunciation, Resurrection of Lazarus, Birth of Christ, Trinity, Archangel Michael, Paul the Apostle, The Redeemer. The final scene crossfades from the icons and shows four horses standing by a river in thunder and rain.

Cast
 Anatoly Solonitsyn – Andrei Rublev
 Ivan Lapikov – Kirill
 Nikolai Grinko – Daniil Chyorny
 Nikolai Sergeyev – Theophanes the Greek
 Irma Raush – Durochka (the holy fool girl)
 Nikolai Burlyayev – Boriska
 Yuriy Nazarov – Prince Yury of Zvenigorod/Grand Duke Vasily I of Moscow
 Yuri Nikulin – Patrikei the messenger
 Rolan Bykov – the Skomorokh
 Mikhail Kononov – Foma
 Nikolai Grabbe – sotnik Stepan
 Dmitry Orlovsky – old master (voiced by Ivan Ryzhov)
 Nikolay Glazkov – Yefim
 Nelly Snegina – Marfa
 Bolot Beyshenaliyev – Edigu, Khan of the Nogai Horde
 Igor Donskoy – Jesus in the Passion Play
 Irina Miroshnichenko – Mary Magdalene in the Passion Play
The voices of the Grand Duke's children were provided by Klara Rumyanova.

Production
In 1961, while working on his first feature film Ivan's Childhood, Tarkovsky made a proposal to Mosfilm for a film on the life of Russia's greatest icon painter, Andrei Rublev. The contract was signed in 1962 and the first treatment was approved in December 1963. Tarkovsky and his co-screenwriter Andrei Konchalovsky worked for more than two years on the script, studying medieval writings and chronicles and books on medieval history and art. In April 1964 the script was approved and Tarkovsky began working on the film. At the same time the script was published in the influential film magazine Iskusstvo Kino, and was widely discussed among historians, film critics and ordinary readers. The discussion on Andrei Rublev centered on the sociopolitical and historical, and not the artistic aspects of the film.

According to Tarkovsky, the original idea for a film about the life of Andrei Rublev was due to the film actor Vasily Livanov. Livanov proposed to write a screenplay together with Tarkovsky and Konchalovsky while they were strolling through a forest on the outskirts of Moscow. He also mentioned that he would love to play Andrei Rublev. Tarkovsky did not intend the film to be a historical or a biographical film about Andrei Rublev. Instead, he was motivated by the idea of showing the connection between a creative character's personality and the times through which he lives. He wanted to show an artist's maturing and the development of his talent. He chose Andrei Rublev for his importance in the history of Russian culture.

Casting

Tarkovsky cast Anatoly Solonitsyn for the role of Andrei Rublev. At this time Solonitsyn was an unknown actor at a theater in Sverdlovsk. According to Tarkovsky everybody had a different image of the historical figure of Andrei Rublev, thus casting an unknown actor who would not remind viewers of other roles was his favoured approach. Solonitsyn, who had read the film script in the film magazine Iskusstvo Kino, was very enthusiastic about the role, traveled to Moscow at his own expense to meet Tarkovsky and even declared that no one could play this role better than him. Tarkovsky felt the same, saying that "with Solonitsyn I simply got lucky". For the role of Andrei Rublev he required "a face with great expressive power in which one could see a demoniacal single-mindedness". To Tarkovsky, Solonitsyn provided the right physical appearance and the talent of showing complex psychological processes. Solonitsyn would continue to work with the director, appearing in Solaris, Mirror, and Stalker, and in the title role of Tarkovsky's 1976 stage production of Hamlet in Moscow's Lenkom Theatre. Before his death from cancer in 1982, Solonitsyn was also intended to play protagonist Andrei Gorchakov in Tarkovsky's 1983 Italian-Russian co-production Nostalghia, and to star in a project titled The Witch which Tarkovsky would significantly alter into his final production, The Sacrifice.

Filming

According to Johnson, filming did not begin until April 1965, one year after approval of the script, with J. Hoberman reporting a slightly earlier date of September 1964 for the start of filming in his film essay for the Criterion collection release of the film. The initial budget was 1.6 million Rbls, but it was cut several times to one million roubles (In comparison, Sergei Bondarchuk's War and Peace had a budget of eight and half million roubles). As a result of the budget restrictions several scenes from the script were cut, including an opening scene showing the Battle of Kulikovo. Other scenes that were cut from the script are a hunting scene, where the younger brother of the Grand Duke hunts swans, and a scene showing peasants helping Durochka giving birth to her Russian-Tatar child. In the end the film cost 1.3 million Rbls, with the cost overrun due to heavy snowfall, which disrupted shooting from November 1965 until April 1966. The film was shot on location, on the Nerl River and the historical places of Vladimir/Suzdal, Pskov, Izborsk and Pechory.

Tarkovsky chose to shoot the main film in black and white and the epilogue, showing some of Rublev's icons, in color. In an interview he motivated his choice with the claim that in everyday life one does not consciously notice colors. Consequently, Rublev's life is in black and white, whereas his art is in color. The film was thus able to express the co-dependence of an artist's art and his personal life. In a 1969 interview, Tarkovsky stated that the flying man in the prologue is "the symbol of daring, in the sense that creation requires from man the complete offering of his being. Whether one wishes to fly before it has become possible, or cast a bell without having learned how to do it, or paint an icon – all these acts demand that, for the price of his creation, man should die, dissolve himself in his work, give himself entirely."

The color sequence of Rublev's icons begins with showing only selected details, climaxing in Rublev's most famous icon, Trinity (Andrei Rublev)The Trinity. One reason for including this color finale was, according to Tarkovsky, to give the viewer some rest and to allow him to detach himself from Rublev's life and to reflect. The film finally ends with the image of horses at river in the rain. To Tarkovsky horses symbolized life, and including horses in the final scene (and in many other scenes in the film) meant that life was the source of all of Rublev's art.

Editing
The first cut of the film was known as Andrei Passion (Strasti po Andryeyu, "The Passion according to Andrei"), though this title was not used for the released version of the film. The first cut of the film was over 195 minutes in length prior to being edited down to its released length. The first cut was completed in July 1966. Goskino demanded cuts to the film, citing its length, negativity, violence, and nudity. After Tarkovsky completed this first version, it would be five years before the film was widely released in the Soviet Union. The ministry's demands for cuts first resulted in a 190-minute version. Despite Tarkovsky's objections expressed in a letter to Alexey Romanov, the chairman of Goskino, the ministry demanded further cuts, and Tarkovsky trimmed the length to 186 minutes.

Robert Bird in his analysis of the comparison of the first cut of the film to the final Tarkovsky cut of the edited film summarized the editing process stating: "The most conspicuous cuts were the most graphic shots of the stonemasons' gouged-out eyes, the burning cow, and the horse being lanced (although its horrific fall remained). Four embedded scenes of flashbacks or fantasies were also cut completely: Foma's fantasy of flight in episode two, Andrei's reminiscence of the three monks under a rain-soaked oak tree in episode four, the younger prince's fantasy of humiliating the Grand Duke in episode five, and Boriska's recollection of the bellfounding in episode seven. All in all, I have counted thirty-six shots which were completely deleted in the 185-minute version of Andrei Rublev, and about eighty-five which were considerably abbreviated, including nine very long takes which are split each into two or more parts. The total number of shots went from 403 to 390, with the average shot length dropping from 31" to 28". The only sequence which remained inviolable was the Epilogue in color."

Depictions of violence
Several scenes within the film depict violence, torture and cruelty toward animals, which sparked controversy at the time of release. Most of these scenes took place during the raid of Vladimir, including one showing the blinding and the torture of a monk. The scenes involving cruelty toward animals were largely simulated. For example, during the Tatar raid of Vladimir a cow is set on fire. In reality the cow had an asbestos-covered coat and was not physically harmed; however, one scene depicts the real death of a horse. The horse falls from a flight of stairs and is then stabbed by a spear. To produce this image, Tarkovsky injured the horse by shooting it in the neck and then pushed it from the stairs, causing the animal to falter and fall down the flight of stairs. From there, the camera pans off the horse onto some soldiers to the left and then pans back right onto the horse, and we see the horse struggling to get its footing having fallen over on its back before being stabbed by the spear. The animal was then shot in the head afterward off camera. This was done to avoid the possibility of harming what was considered a less expendable, highly prized stunt horse. The horse was brought in from a slaughterhouse, killed on set, and then returned to the abattoir for commercial consumption. In a 1967 interview for Literaturnoe obozrenie, interviewer Aleksandr Lipkov suggested to Tarkovsky that "the cruelty in the film is shown precisely to shock and stun the viewers. And this may even repel them." In an attempt to downplay the cruelty Tarkovsky responded: "No, I don't agree. This does not hinder viewer perception. Moreover we did all this quite sensitively. I can name films that show much more cruel things, compared to which ours looks quite modest."

Release and censorship
The film premiered with a single screening at the Dom Kino in Moscow in 1966. Audience reaction was enthusiastic, despite some criticism of the film's naturalistic depiction of violence. But the film failed to win approval for release from Soviet censors; the Central Committee of the Communist Party wrote in its review that "the film's ideological erroneousness is not open to doubt." Andrei Rublev was accused of being "anti-historical" in its failure to portray the context of its hero's life: the rapid development of large cities and the struggle against the Mongols. In February 1967, Tarkovsky and Alexei Romanov complained that the film was not yet approved for a wide release but refused to cut further scenes from the film.

Andrei Rublev was invited to the Cannes Film Festival in 1967 as part of a planned retrospective of Soviet film on occasion of the 50th anniversary of the October Revolution. The official answer was that the film was not yet completed and could not be shown at the film festival. A second invitation was made by the organizers of the Cannes Film Festival in 1969. Soviet officials accepted this invitation, but they only allowed the film to screen at the festival out of competition, and it was screened just once at 4 A.M. on the final day of the festival. Audience response nevertheless was enthusiastic, and the film won the FIPRESCI prize. Soviet officials tried to prevent the official release of the film in France and other countries, but were not successful as the French distributor had legally acquired the rights in 1969.

In the Soviet Union, influential admirers of Tarkovsky's work—including the film director Grigori Kozintsev, the composer Dmitri Shostakovich and Yevgeny Surkov, the editor of Iskusstvo Kino—began pressuring for the release of Andrei Rublev. Tarkovsky and his second wife, Larisa Tarkovskaya, wrote letters to other influential personalities in support of the film's release, and Larisa Tarkovskaya even went with the film to Alexei Kosygin, then the Premier of the Soviet Union.

Despite Tarkovsky's refusal to make further cuts, Andrei Rublev finally was released on December 24, 1971, in the 186-minute 1966 version. The film was released in 277 prints and sold 2.98 million tickets. When the film was released, Tarkovsky remarked in his diary that in the entire city not a single poster for the film could be seen but that all theaters were sold out.

Tarkovsky final cut
Despite the cuts having originated with Goskino's demands, Tarkovsky ultimately endorsed the  cut of the film over the original 205-minute version:

Nobody has ever cut anything from Andrei Rublev. Nobody except me. I made some cuts myself. In the first version, the film was 3 hours and 20 minutes long. In the second — 3 hours 15 minutes. I shortened the final version to 3 hours 6 minutes. I am convinced the latest version is the best, the most successful. And I only cut certain overly long scenes. The viewer doesn't even notice their absence. The cuts have in no way changed the subject matter nor what was important in the film for us. In other words, we removed overly long scenes which had no significance. We shortened certain scenes of brutality in order to induce psychological shock in viewers, as opposed to a mere unpleasant impression that would only destroy our intent. All my friends and colleagues who, during long discussions, were advising me to make those cuts turned out right in the end. It took me some time to understand it. At first, I got the impression they were attempting to pressure my creative individuality. Later I understood that this final version of the film more than fulfils my requirements for it. And I do not regret at all that the film has been shortened to its present length.

The original 1966 version of the film titled as The Passion According to Andrei was published by The Criterion Collection in 2018 and released in both DVD and Blu-Ray format.

Unauthorized Soviet television version
In 1973, the film was shown on Soviet television in a 101-minute version that Tarkovsky did not authorize. Notable scenes that were cut from this version were the raid of the Tatars and the scene showing naked pagans. The epilogue showing details of Andrei Rublev's icons was in black and white as the Soviet Union had not yet fully transitioned to color TV. In 1987, when Andrei Rublev was once again shown on Soviet TV, the epilogue was once again in black and white, despite the Soviet Union having completely transitioned to color TV. Another difference from the original version of the film was the inclusion of a short explanatory note at the beginning of the film, detailing the life of Andrei Rublev and the historical background. When the film was released in the U.S. and other countries in 1973, the distributor Columbia Pictures cut it by an additional 20 minutes, making the film an incoherent mess in the eyes of many critics and leading to unfavorable reviews.

Scorsese use of the first-cut version
In the mid-1990s, Criterion Collection released the first-cut 205-minute version of Andrei Rublev on LaserDisc, which Criterion re-issued on DVD in 1999 (Criterion advertises this version as the "director's cut" despite Tarkovsky's stated preference for the 186-minute version). According to Tarkovsky's sister, Marina Tarkovskaya, one of the editors of the film, Lyudmila Feiginova, secretly kept a print of the 205-minute cut under her bed. Criterion's producer of the project stated that the video transfer was sourced from a film print that filmmaker Martin Scorsese had acquired while visiting Russia. In 2016, a Blu-ray version of the film was released in the United Kingdom using the 186-minute version preferred by Tarkovsky. Criterion released both the first and final cut of the film on DVD and Blu-ray in September 2018.

Reception
Andrei Rublev won several awards. In 1969, the film was screened at the Cannes Film Festival. Due to pressure by Soviet officials, the film could only be shown out of competition, and was thus not eligible for the Palme d'Or or the Grand Prix. Nevertheless, it won the prize of the international film critics, FIPRESCI. In 1971 Andrei Rublev won the Critics Award of the French Syndicate of Cinema Critics, and in 1973 the Jussi Award for Best Foreign Film.

Andrei Rublev has an approval rating of 95% on review aggregator website Rotten Tomatoes, based on 42 reviews, and an average rating of 8.92/10.The website's critical consensus states, "Andrei Rublev is a cerebral epic that filters challenging ideas through a grand scope -- forming a moving thesis on art, faith, and the sweep of history".

J. Hoberman, a film critic for The Village Voice, summarized the early reception of the film in the film notes included in the Criterion DVD release of the film stating: "Two years later (in 1973), Rublev surfaced at the New York Film Festival, cut another 20 minutes by its American distributor, Columbia Pictures. Time (magazine) compared the movie unfavorably to Dr. Zhivago; those other New York reviewers who took note begged off explication, citing Rublev's apparent truncation."

Legacy
The film was ranked No. 87 in Empire magazine's "The 100 Best Films Of World Cinema" in 2010.

The film is referenced in Tarkovsky's two films that followed this one. It is first referenced in Solaris, made in 1972, by having an icon by Andrei Rublev being placed in the main character's room. It is next referenced by having a poster of the film being hung on a wall in Mirror, made in 1975.

In 1995, The Vatican placed Andrei Rublev on their list of 45 "great films". The Village Voice ranked the film at number 112 in its Top 250 "Best Films of the Century" list in 1999, based on a poll of critics.

The film was Voted at No. 77 on the list of "100 Greatest Films" by the prominent French magazine Cahiers du cinéma in 2008. In 2010, Andrei Rublev tied for second in a U.K. newspaper series of the "Greatest Films of All Time" as voted by critics from The Guardian and The Observer. Also in 2010, the film topped the list of The Guardian's 25 Best arthouse films of all time.

Also in 2010, the Toronto International Film Festival released its "Essential 100" list of films in which Andrei Rublev also placed No. 87.

In 2011, director Joanna Hogg listed it as a film that changed her life. In the 2012 Sight & Sound polls, it was ranked the 26th-greatest film ever made in the critics' poll and 13th in the directors' poll. In the earlier 2002 version of the list the film ranked 35th among critics and 24th among directors. In Critics poll by the same magazine it ranked 11th and 24th in 1982 and 1992 respectively. In 2018 the film ranked at number 40 on the BBC's list of the 100 greatest foreign-language films, as voted on by 209 film critics from 43 countries.

See also
 Middle Ages in film

References
Footnotes
 In the Soviet Union the role of a producer was different from that in Western countries and more similar to the role of a line producer or a unit production manager.

Notes

Bibliography

External links

 
 
 
 
 Andrei Rublev an essay by J. Hoberman at the Criterion Collection 
 Voted #8 on The Arts and Faith Top 100 Films (2010)

1966 films
Soviet biographical drama films
1960s Russian-language films
Tatar-language films
1960s Italian-language films
Russian biographical drama films
Biographical films about painters
Films about Christianity
Films directed by Andrei Tarkovsky
Films set in Moscow
Films set in the 1400s
Films set in the 1410s
Films set in the 1420s
Films shot in Moscow
Films shot in Vladimir Oblast
Films partially in color
Mosfilm films
Film censorship in Russia
Film controversies in Russia
Animal cruelty incidents in film
Cultural depictions of Russian men
Cultural depictions of 15th-century painters
Censored films
1966 drama films
Films about Orthodoxy
1960s biographical drama films
1960s multilingual films
Russian multilingual films
Soviet multilingual films
Soviet epic films